"Honestly" is a song by American alternative rock group Zwan. It was the first single from their album, Mary Star of the Sea. The song was written by Billy Corgan.

The song was used for the ending of the 2023 video game Hi-Fi RUSH by Tango Gameworks. The B-side "The Number of the Beast", an acoustic cover version of the heavy metal band Iron Maiden, was used in the opening credits of the 2002 film Spun by director Jonas Åkerlund.

Content
"Honestly" is a rock song in the key of D major. Musically, it bears some similarities to the chord progression of Corgan compositions "Today" and the chorus of "Cherub Rock". The guitar parts liberally use a flanger effect.

Track listing

Personnel
 Linda Strawberry – additional singing and piano

Charts

References

2003 songs
2003 debut singles
Songs written by Billy Corgan
Song recordings produced by Billy Corgan
Zwan songs